1953 flood may refer to:

 North Sea flood of 1953, affecting England, Netherlands and other countries 
 1953 Northern Kyushu flood, Japan